María Guadalupe Bautista Hernández (born 19 April 1988) is a Mexican professional boxer. She is a two-time world light flyweight champion, having held the WBA (Regular) female title since December 2020 and previously the IBF female title in 2018. As of December 2020, she is ranked as the world's ninth best active female light flyweight by BoxRec.

Professional career
Bautista suffered her first defeat in her professional debut on 17 September 2009, losing via four-round unanimous decision (UD) against future world champion Maribel Ramírez at the Woda Night Club in Mexico City.

After compiling a record of 3–4–1—including two more defeats to Maribel Ramírez—Bautista suffered three consecutive defeats via UD against future world champions in 2012; Ibeth Zamora Silva for the WBC Youth female light flyweight title on 3 March; Esmeralda Moreno for the WBC Silver female light flyweight title on 17 May; and Jessica Nery Plata for the WBC Youth female light flyweight title on 7 July.

After two years out of the ring, she bounced back from the defeats with a four-round split decision (SD) victory against Itzel Barrera in September 2014, followed by a six-round points decision (PTS) loss against another future world champion, Monserrat Alarcón, in December. Bautista captured the vacant Mexican female light flyweight title in her next fight, defeating Mitzi Rodríguez via ten-round SD on 30 May 2015, at the Gimnasio Sportyka in Mexico City.

After nine more fights—seven wins, one loss and one draw—she faced Andrea Sanchez for the vacant IBF female light flyweight title. The bout took place on 12 May 2018, at the Club Unión Progresista in Villa Ángela, Argentina, with Bautista emerging victorious with an eighth-round technical knockout (TKO) to capture the vacant IBF title. She lost the title via SD in her first defence, suffering the eleventh defeat of her career, against Evelyn Nazarena Bermúdez on 29 December at Club Atlético Talleres in Villa Gobernador Gálvez, Argentina. One judge scored the bout 96–94 in favour of Bautista while the other two scored it 96–94 to Bermúdez.

In her next fight she moved up to the flyweight division, defeating Nayeli Verde via UD (100–90, 100–90, 100–91) to capture the WBC Silver female title on 24 August 2019, at the Auditorio Sub-Delegacion Valle Verde in Ixtapaluca, Mexico. She ended 2019 with a UD victory against Karen Rubio in December to retain her title.

Following two decision wins in non-title fights, she moved back down to light flyweight to face Nora Cardoza for the vacant WBA (Regular) female light flyweight title. The bout took place on 12 December 2020 at the Salon de Fiestas Figlos Stase in Culiacán, Mexico. Bautista defeated Cardoza via shutout UD, with all three judges scoring the bout 100–90.

Professional boxing record

References

External links

Living people
1988 births
Mexican women boxers
Boxers from Mexico City
Light-flyweight boxers
Flyweight boxers
World light-flyweight boxing champions
International Boxing Federation champions
World Boxing Association champions